Batňovice is a municipality and village in Trutnov District in the Hradec Králové Region of the Czech Republic. It has about 800 inhabitants.

History
The first written mention of Batňovice is from 1408.

References

External links

Villages in Trutnov District